Statistics of Portuguese Liga in the 1981–82 season.

Overview
It was contested by 16 teams, and Sporting Clube de Portugal won the championship.

C.F. Os Belenenses, who had co-founded the league in 1934 with Sporting, S.L. Benfica and F.C. Porto, was relegated for the first time.

League standings

Results

Season statistics

Top goalscorers

Footnotes

External links
 Portugal 1981-82 - RSSSF (Jorge Miguel Teixeira)
 Portuguese League 1981/82 - footballzz.co.uk
 Portugal - Table of Honor - Soccer Library 
 Portuguese Wikipedia - Campeonato Português de Futebol - I Divisão 1981/1982

Primeira Liga seasons
1981–82 in Portuguese football
Portugal